The People's Prize is a North Korean arts and sciences award. It is awarded by the People's Prize Awarding Commission, which is working directly under the Cabinet of North Korea. The prize can be granted to works of art or people. People's Prize has been an important award in the field of North Korean cinema.

The works and people that have received the People's Prize cover such varied fields as literature, gymnastics, Korean revolutionary opera, acupuncture and sculpture. The People's Prize has been received by people abroad.

History
The People's Prize was instituted on 8 September 1958.

The first North Korean feature film My Hometown (1949) was directed by Kang Hongshik. It was the first of a film series to be awarded People's Prize. Kim Il-sung praised many of People's Prize winning movies from 1960s and 1970s of supplying an exhaustive answer to the issue of people's . The Workers' Party gives the award to those North Korean films and film-makers seen as fulfilling the role of an "excellent textbook" for the workers party.

Some of the works, which did not become recognized as "Immortal classics", did earn People's Prize meant only for the best productions. One such production is a three-part film Five Guerilla Brothers (1968) directed by Choe Ik-gyu, and overseen by Kim Jong-il himself. Other films overseen by Kim to win the People's Prize were A Flowering Village and A Family of Workers (1971). In the case of the A Family of Workers, Kim Jong-il was reportedly not satisfied with the application of the seed theory. However, some of Kim Jong-il's movies, such as Sea of Blood (1968) and Flower girl (1972), became "Immortal classics".

In 1965 the Chongryon established Chosun University's teaching staff in Japan received the prize.

Many of the works to obtain People's Prize are still highly regarded in North Korea. Reminiscences of the Anti-Japanese Guerillas is regarded as classic of literature of the Workers' Party, and was awarded People's Prize in 2012. It is still used in daily ideological study sessions at workplaces, and many of the memoirs have later been made into movies.

People's Prize winner Kim Song-gun's major work Waves of the Sea Kumgang was used as a background for a group photo with Kim Jong-il and Bill Clinton during Clinton's visit to North Korea in 2009. Kim Song-gun received the award for his painting Waves of the Sea Kumgang in 1999.

List of works and people having received the prize

Arts
A granite sculpture Trumpeter of Advance(진격의 나팔수) (awarded in September 1988)
The Chollima Statue
Waves of the Sea Kumgang painted by Kim Song-gun (awarded in 1999)
O Hye-yong is a film scriptwriter known for adapting true stories into films.

Books

History(력사)  by Han Sorya (1958)
Reminiscences of the Anti-Japanese Guerillas (awarded in March 2012)
Among the People (awarded in April 1992)

Education
Chosun University teaching staff received the prize on 8 January 1965.

Gymnastics

Ever-victorious Workers' Party of Korea (awarded in 2011)
Korea of Chollima
Single-minded Unity (awarded in 2011)
Song of Korea
The People Sing of Their Leader (awarded in 2011)
Under the Banner of the Party (awarded in 1980)
We Will Defend Red Flag Under Leadership of Marshal (awarded in 1996)

Movies

A Family of Workers
A Red Agitator (awarded in 1962)
Daughter of the Sun (awarded in 1962)
Demarcation Line in the Town (awarded in 1962)
The Flourishing Village
Five Guerilla Brothers
Rolling Mill Workers
When Apples Are Picked
Girls at a Port
The Brigade Commander's Former Superior
My Hometown
Sea of Blood
Sunflower (awarded in 1962)
Fate of a Self-defence Corps Man
The Spinner
A Worker's Family
The Flower Girl
An Jung Gun Shoots Ito Hirobumi
Guarantee

Musical plays
Under a Bright Sun(밝은 태양아래에서) (awarded on 30 December 1962)

Revolutionary opera

The Story of a Nurse(한 간호원에 대한 이야기)

Science
Kim Bong-han received the prize on 2 February 1962 for his work on acupuncture.
Kye Ung-sang known for his research on eri and tussar silkworms received the prize in 1963.

See also

 List of awards for contributions to culture
 Kim Il-sung Prize
 Lenin Prize
 Orders and medals of North Korea
 People's Artist

References

Sources

External links
Waves of the Sea Kumgang in a group photo with Bill Clinton and Kim Jong-il at Time.com

Orders, decorations, and medals of North Korea
Arts awards
Asian film awards
Asian music awards
Awards for contributions to culture
Asian literary awards
Civil awards and decorations
Society of North Korea
Performing arts awards